Edward Dowling may refer to:

 Edward J. Dowling (1875–?), American lawyer and politician from New York
 Edward Dowling (priest) (1898–1960), Jesuit priest and spiritual advisor
 Eddie Dowling (1889–1976), American actor, screenwriter, playwright, director, producer, songwriter, and composer